The Ogon River is a river located in Sanduan Province, Papua New Guinea. It is at an elevation of 2,707 meters above sea level.

References 

Rivers of Papua New Guinea
Sandaun Province